Edgewood is an unincorporated community in Boone County, Illinois, United States. Edgewood is located on U.S. Route 20 west of Belvidere.

References

Unincorporated communities in Boone County, Illinois
Unincorporated communities in Illinois